Rye Town Hall may refer to the following town halls:

 Rye Town Hall, East Sussex, England
 Rye Town Hall (New Hampshire), United States

See also 
 Ryde Town Hall, Isle of Wight, England